Kevin Kerr (born 1968 in Vancouver, British Columbia) is a Canadian playwright, actor, director and founding member of Electric Company Theatre.  From 2007 to 2010, he was Lee Playwright in Residence at University of Alberta.

He was born in Vancouver and grew up in Kamloops, British Columbia. He studied theatre at the University of British Columbia, and at Studio 58, Langara College.

He has co-authored several plays with Electric Company Theatre based in Vancouver, British Columbia including The Wake, The Score, Dora Flor and Her Two Husbands, Flop, The Fall, and Brilliant! The Blinding Enlightenment of Nikola Tesla.  His 2001 play Unity (1918) explores the Influenza epidemic of 1918 and won the 2002 Governor General's Award for Drama.

Published works
Unity (1918). Vancouver, BC: Talonbooks, 2002. .
Brilliant!: The Blinding Enlightenment of Nikola Tesla. Victoria, BC: Brindle and Glass, 2004. 
Studies in Motion. Vancouver, BC: Talonbooks, 2008. .
Skydive. Vancouver, BC: Talonbooks, 2010. .

References

External links
 Electric Company Theatre

1968 births
Living people
21st-century Canadian dramatists and playwrights
Writers from Vancouver
University of British Columbia alumni
Male actors from Vancouver
Governor General's Award-winning dramatists
Canadian male stage actors
Canadian male dramatists and playwrights
21st-century Canadian male writers
Studio 58 people